Bandahalli is a village in Nallampalli Taluk, Dharmapuri district, Tamil Nadu, India.

Schools near Bandahalli

The Government Higher Secondary School, Bandahalli, is the only school located in Bandahalli.
The Government Elementary School, Bandahalli.
Jayam Narsri Primary School, Pangunatham.

Colleges near Bandahalli

Jayalakshmi Institute of Technology. Address : Dharmapuri—636 352.
Marutam Nelli Polytechnic College. Address :  Dalavahalli, Nallampalli, Dharmapuri—636 803.
Christ College of Education for Women. Address : Christ Garden, Collector bungalow back side, A.Jettihalli, Dharmapuri.
Jayam Institute of Technology . Address : Dharmapuri—636 352

Villages near Bandahalli

Pangunatham
Ramarkoodal
Parapatti
Echanahalli

Airports near Bandahalli
Salem Airport - 60 km
Kempegowda International Airport - 180 km

External links
Bandahalli at gloriousindia.com

References 

Villages in Dharmapuri district